Mama Jack is a 2005 South African comedy film by Leon Schuster. It was directed by Gray Hofmeyr and distributed by Nu Metro. It is one of Leon Schuster's most successful films

Plot
Set in Cape Town, South Africa, Mama Jack is the story of Jack Theron, an ordinary person working on a film set as a grip. However, his movie producer boss, John Daragon, hates him and wants to remove him from the production of the movie they are producing about Nelson Mandela, Sweet Bird of Freedom. In a bid to get rid of Jack, the producer spikes his drink with a fictitious drug, Mama Africa, at a glamorous function, and before long Jack has unwittingly offended all the attending dignitaries, ruined the function and got himself on the wrong side of the law while hallucinating.

While on the run, Jack turns to his friend and house mate, Shorty, who is a make-up artist who turns him into "Mama Bolo". Mama Bolo soon finds “herself” employed by the producer's fiancée, Angela, and begins to fall in love with her. A series of deceptions and misunderstandings pile up and comic mayhem ensues with Jack Theron becoming another character, Doctor Donald, a tramp from Scotland.

During the movie premier, Mama Bolo being found out by her dress being torn off her when Stanley stands on the long, green train of her dress. John admits to drugging Jack and is arrested and put in prison. 6 weeks later, Angela is found with her daughter and the domestic workers. Jack uses his grip line down the cable line to reach Angela and confesses his love for her. Jack and Angela later get married. John is later seen escaping through a manhole cover in the road and is dragged by Jack and Angela's car at the end of the film.

Cast
 Leon Schuster as Jack Theron, Mama Bolo, Dr. Donald
 Alfred Ntombela as Shorty Dladla
 Mary-Anne Barlow as Angela
 Lionel Newton as John Daragon
 Jerry Mofokeng as Stanley
 Laura Catlin as Rivonia Ryder
 Andrea Dondolo as Sisi Dladla
 Lee Duru as Gladys
 Bongi Mdongwe as Innocence
 Shaleen Surtie-Richards as Mayoress

References

External links
 Mama Jack Official Site

2005 comedy films
2005 films
South African comedy films
Afrikaans-language films
English-language South African films